Ana Đokić (born 9 February 1979) is a former Serbian and Montenegrin handball player. She participated at the 2011 World Women's Handball Championship in Brazil.

Đokić also competed at the 2012 Summer Olympics, where the Montenegrin team won the silver medal.

She currently plays for ŽRK Vardar, in the Macedonian League and the EHF Cup.

References

External links 
 
 
 

1979 births
Living people
Serbian female handball players
Montenegrin female handball players
Montenegrin people of Serbian descent
Olympic handball players of Montenegro
Olympic medalists in handball
Olympic silver medalists for Montenegro
Handball players at the 2012 Summer Olympics
Medalists at the 2012 Summer Olympics
Mediterranean Games silver medalists for Serbia
Mediterranean Games medalists in handball
Competitors at the 2005 Mediterranean Games
People from Aranđelovac
RK Podravka Koprivnica players